Red bat may refer to:

Eastern red bat (Lasiurus borealis), a species of bat found in the Eastern United States
Western red bat (Lasiurus blossevillii), a species of bat found in Western United States, also called the "Desert red bat"
The Red Bat, a cartoon character

Animal common name disambiguation pages